Relatives of the former prime minister of the United Kingdom, David Cameron feature in law, politics and finance, as well connections to the British aristocracy.

Immediate family

David Cameron is the younger son of stockbroker Ian Donald Cameron (12 October 1932 – 8 September 2010) and his wife Mary Fleur (born Mount, 1934), a retired justice of the peace and second daughter of Sir William Mount.

Cameron's father, Ian, was born with both legs deformed and underwent repeated operations to correct them. Cameron's parents were married in 1962. He was born in London, and brought up in Peasemore, Berkshire. His father was born at Blairmore House near Huntly, Aberdeenshire, and died near Toulon in France on 8 September 2010.

According to the Feminist Times, as a magistrate, Mary Cameron imposed prison sentences for anti-nuclear weapons protests at the Greenham Common Women's Peace Camp.

He has an elder brother, Alexander Cameron KC, and two sisters, Tania Rachel (born 1965) and Clare Louise (born 1971).

Ancestry

Alexander Geddes

Blairmore House, the birthplace of Ian Cameron, was built by his great-grandfather, Alexander Geddes, who had made a fortune in Chicago trading in grain and returned to Scotland in the 1880s.

Aristocratic connections
David Cameron has no aristocratic titles. However, he has several distant connections to the aristocracy.

Cameron descends from King William IV and his mistress Dorothea Jordan through their illegitimate daughter Lady Elizabeth FitzClarence to the fifth female generation Enid Agnes Maud Levita. His father's maternal grandmother, Stephanie Levita (née Cooper), was the daughter of Sir Alfred Cooper and Lady Agnes Duff (sister of Alexander Duff, 1st Duke of Fife) and a sister of Duff Cooper, 1st Viscount Norwich , the Conservative statesman and author. His paternal grandmother, Enid Levita, who married secondly in 1961 the Hon. Robert Watson (younger son of the 1st Baron Manton), was the daughter of Arthur Levita and niece of Sir Cecil Levita , chairman of London County Council in 1928. Through Lord Manton's family, Cameron is also a kinsman of the 3rd Baron Hesketh , Conservative Lords Chief Whip 1991–93. Cameron's maternal grandfather was Sir William Mount Bt TD DL, a British Army officer and the High Sheriff of Berkshire, and Cameron's maternal great-grandfather was Sir William Mount Bt CBE, Conservative MP for Newbury 1910–1922. Lady Ida Feilding, Cameron's great-great grandmother, was third daughter of William Feilding, Earl of Denbigh and Desmond GCH PC, a courtier and Gentleman of the Bedchamber.

Through his descent from William IV, he was sixth cousin once removed to Queen Elizabeth II, and is seventh cousin to King Charles III.

Finance
David Cameron's forebears have a long history in finance. His father Ian was senior partner of the stockbrokers Panmure Gordon & Co., in which firm partnerships had long been held by Cameron's ancestors, including his grandfather and great-grandfather, and was a director of estate agent John D. Wood. His great-great grandfather Emile Levita, a German Jewish financier who obtained British citizenship in 1871, was the director of the Chartered Bank of India, Australia and China which became Standard Chartered Bank in 1969. Sir Ewen Cameron, another great-great-grandfather, was London chairman of the Hong Kong and Shanghai Bank; he played a key role in arranging loans from the Rothschild family to Japan during the Russo-Japanese War. Great-grandfather, Ewen Allan Cameron, was partner of Panmure Gordon stockbrokers and served on the Corporation of Foreign Bondholders, and the Committee for Chinese Bondholders (set up by the then-Governor of the Bank of England, Sir Montagu Norman (later Lord Norman) in November 1935).

In 1982, Ian Cameron was involved in creating Panamanian Blairmore Holdings, an offshore investment fund, valued around $20 million in 1988. This investment fund used controversial bearer shares until 2006. Ian Cameron was named in the Panama Papers, documents leaked in April 2016 from the Panama-based legal and business services company Mossack Fonseca.

Notable living relations
Cameron is a nephew of Sir William Dugdale, brother-in-law of Katherine, Lady Dugdale (died 2004, former lady-in-waiting to the queen), who was chairman of Aston Villa Football Club. Birmingham-born documentary filmmaker Joshua Dugdale is his cousin. Cameron's other notable relations include Adam Hart-Davis, Duff Hart-Davis, and Ferdinand Mount (Sir Ferdinand Mount Bt FRSL).

Notes

External notes
 www.burkespeerage.com
 Wargs ancestry site

References

David Cameron
People named in the Panama Papers